Richard Kress (alternative writing Richard Kreß) (6 March 1925 – 30 March 1996) was a German footballer.

He played for Eintracht Frankfurt from 1953 until 1964 as a typical right winger. He won the German championship in 1959 and played in the European Cup final in 1960 which was lost to Real Madrid 3–7 on 18 May at Hampden Park in Glasgow in front of 135,000 spectators. Kress scored the first goal of the match.

Kress also worked in a chemist's shop with his wife in Frankfurt. He could be regularly met on his way to the Eintracht training facility in Riederwald on line 18.
 
He was capped nine times for Germany between 1954 and 1961 contributing two goals.

Kress still is the oldest player to give his debut in the Bundesliga.

Honours 
 German championship: 1958–59
 European Cup: runners-up 1959–60
 Oberliga Süd: 1958–59; runners-up 1953–54, 1960–61, 1961–62
 DFB-Pokal: runners-up 1963–64

References

External links
 Richard Kress at eintracht-archiv.de 

1925 births
1996 deaths
Germany international footballers
German footballers
Bundesliga players
Eintracht Frankfurt players
Association football forwards
People from Fulda
Sportspeople from Kassel (region)
Footballers from Hesse
West German footballers